Yuri Mikhailovich Kovtun (born 5 January 1970) is a Russian football coach and a former defender, well known as a 1990s Russia national football team player, as well as Dynamo Moscow and Spartak Moscow stopper. He is an assistant coach of FC Rodina Moscow.

Playing career 
Kovtun's career started in minor Russian club Luch Azov in 1988. Then he started his career as a professional player in FC SKA Rostov-na-Donu and FC Rostselmash Rostov-on-Don. In 1992, Rostselmash and Kovtun starred in the first Russian championship where they unexpectedly promoted to 8th place. Kovtun was impressive during the season so two top teams were interested in him at the same time : Dynamo and Spartak Moscow. In 1993, Kovtun chose Dynamo Moscow and became their key player for years, until his move to Spartak in 1999.

Whereas Kovtun's only honour during his 6-year spell in Dynamo was a Russian Cup in 1995, he won 3 titles in 1999, 2000 and 2001 after joining Spartak. Moreover, he took part in numerous UEFA Champions League games and found himself a regular Russian national football team player.

International career 
Kovtun played for the Russian international team 50 times, scoring 2 goals. The most notable moments of his international career were his long shot goal to Yugoslavia during a 2002 World Cup qualifier and an own goal in a 0–1 away loss to Iceland Euro 2000 qualifying. He was a part of the Russian squad in the Euro 96 and World Cup 2002 finals. Kovtun was sent off in a Euro '96 match for a lunge at Germany's Dieter Eilts.

Strengths and weaknesses 
Kovtun's strong points as a defender were mainly great tackling, tight marking of opponents and scoring goals in the crucial matches. The main weakness of his game throughout his career was a lack of pace and acceleration. Stemming from this lack of speed, he often had to play too dirty so he could easily receive yellow cards or even be sent off (he holds the Russian League record for number of bookings).

Current activity 
During 2005, already a Spartak's veteran, he could not gain a place in the first team and most of the season he played for the reserves. In January 2006, he left Spartak Moscow for just relegated into Russian First Division Alania Vladikavkaz. He retired in 2007 and became a manager for FC MVD Rossii Moscow. FC MVD promoted to the Russian First Division under his supervision.

On the 8th of June, 2009, Kovtun resigned from FC MVD manager position and was replaced by Vladimir Eshtrekov.

Honours 
 1999, 2000, 2001 Russian Premier League
 1995, 2003 Russian Cup

References

External links

1970 births
Living people
Russian footballers
Russian football managers
FC APK Morozovsk players
FC Rostov players
FC Spartak Moscow players
FC Dynamo Moscow players
FC Spartak Vladikavkaz players
FC Arsenal Tula players
UEFA Euro 1996 players
2002 FIFA World Cup players
Russia international footballers
FC SKA Rostov-on-Don players
Russian Premier League players
Association football defenders
People from Azov
FC Tosno players
FC MVD Rossii Moscow players
Sportspeople from Rostov Oblast